Yenkepally is a village and panchayat in Ranga Reddy district, AP, India. It falls under Chevella mandal.

Villages in Ranga Reddy district